= Terbos =

Town in ancient Bithynia

Coordinates: 40°30′34″N 30°01′08″E

Terbos was a town of ancient Bithynia, inhabited during Roman times.

Its site is located near Akçakaya in Asiatic Turkey.
